Aaseji Nagar is a small village located in Phalodi tehsil of Jodhpur district, Rajasthan, India. It has a population of 308 according to the 2011 Indian National Population survey.

There are several temples and schools in the village.

Aaseji Nagar has no railway station, but there are bus services. The Postal Index Number of the village is 342311.

The village is in the Thar desert, and the inhabitants make their living mainly by agriculture. Crops include millet, moong, and wheat. There is a large number of Prosopis cineraria trees. Prosopis cineraria or khejri is the state tree of Rajasthan state.

References

Villages in Jodhpur district